S112 is a Dutch road in Amsterdam.

See also

References

City routes in Amsterdam